Thomas Wood (21 April 1777 – 26 January 1860) was an English Tory and later Conservative politician who sat in the House of Commons from 1806 to 1847.

Early life
Wood was the eldest son of fourteen children of Thomas Wood and Mary Williams, daughter and heiress of Sir Edward Williams, 5th Baronet, of Llangibby Castle. He was the grandson of Thomas Wood, who was MP for Middlesex from 1779 to 1780. 

Wood was educated at Harrow School from 1788 to 1795 before matriculating at Oriel College, Oxford in 1796. The family had accumulated considerable estates at Middleham, Yorkshire, Gwernyfed in Wales and Littleton and Astlam in Middlesex.

Career
In 1806, Wood was elected Member of Parliament (MP) for Breconshire. He held the seat until 1847. He was appointed High Sheriff of Breconshire for 1809 to 1810.

Wood commanded the Royal East Middlesex Militia for 56 years. Wood remained colonel of the Militia and encamped with them at Aldershot in his eightieth year. He succeeded to his mother's estates in 1820 and to his father's estates in 1835.

Personal life
On 23 December 1801, he married Lady Caroline Stewart, daughter of Robert Stewart, 1st Marquess of Londonderry and Frances Stewart, Marchioness of Londonderry (daughter of the Whig politician Charles Pratt, 1st Earl Camden). Together, they had four sons and two daughters, including:

 Thomas Wood (1804–1872), who served as MP for Middlesex; he married Frances Smyth, a daughter of John Henry Smyth and Lady Elizabeth Anne Smyth (daughter of George FitzRoy, 4th Duke of Grafton).
 Sir Charles Alexander Wood (1810–1890), who married Sophia Ann Brownrigg, a daughter of John Studholme Brownrigg, a prominent merchant and MP for Boston.

Wood and his wife enjoyed the friendship of members of the royal family. George IV visited the Woods at Gwernyfed and other royals visited them at Littleton. William IV nominated Wood to be one of his executors.

He died at home in Littleton, at the age of 82.

References

External links

Wood, Thomas, (1777-1860), MP for Brecon at The National Archives

1777 births
1860 deaths
People educated at Harrow School
Alumni of Oriel College, Oxford
UK MPs 1806–1807
UK MPs 1807–1812
UK MPs 1812–1818
UK MPs 1818–1820
UK MPs 1820–1826
UK MPs 1826–1830
UK MPs 1830–1831
UK MPs 1831–1832
UK MPs 1832–1835
UK MPs 1835–1837
UK MPs 1837–1841
UK MPs 1841–1847
Tory MPs (pre-1834)
Conservative Party (UK) MPs for Welsh constituencies
High Sheriffs of Brecknockshire
Middlesex Militia officers